The Cheap Trains Act 1883 was an Act of Parliament of the United Kingdom that marked the beginning of workers' train (and later, bus) services. It removed the passenger duty on any train charging less than a penny (1d) a mile and obliged the railway companies to operate a larger number of cheap trains.

Origin 
The Railway Regulation Act 1844 had established the provision of third-class coaches on what became known as "parliamentary trains". In return, the railways were exempted from paying duty on these passengers.

The duty was collected by the Board of Trade and gradually, as services improved, the board allowed more and more exemptions, even on trains which did not stop at all stations, as required by the Act. However, as the duty collected rose to around £500,000 in the 1860s, the Inland Revenue took an interest.  A test case in 1874 against the North London Railway confirmed that trains must stop at all stations for the duty to be remitted.

This duty had always been irksome to the railway operators, who felt that it hindered their development. The railway operators formed the Passenger Duty Repeal Association in 1874, followed in 1877 by another group, the Travelling Tax Abolition Committee. Between them they lobbied for the complete abolition of the duty. As is usual in these cases, the government would not agree without some quid pro quo.

The Act
This period was one of extreme overcrowding in the major cities.  It was a major political issue and one solution sought by the authorities was to encourage working people to move to new housing outside the cities.  However, this implied the availability of cheap transport, for even a penny a mile was beyond most people's reach.

The Act applied to all trains charging less than a penny a mile, even those that did not stop at all stations.  The Board of Trade could decide whether a company's services were adequate and reasonably priced.  If it felt otherwise, it could remove the company's exemption on all its services.

Its effect
Some railways in London were already operating workmen's trains, although they were often overcrowded and inconveniently timed. Although the Act was opposed by some railway officers, notably Sir Edward Watkin of the Manchester, Sheffield and Lincolnshire Railway, the number of cheap suburban services increased greatly.  During the 20th century, the appearance of competing road services meant that the railways were forced to reduce their fares.  So few services eventually attracted duty, that it was abolished in the Finance Act 1929.

References

External links
Railways Archive: Cheap Trains Act

1883 in British law
History of rail transport in the United Kingdom
United Kingdom Acts of Parliament 1883
Railway Acts
1883 in rail transport